Iraj Bastami (November 22, 1957 — December 26, 2003) was a Persian classical musician and vocalist. Bastami died in the Bam earthquake.

Discography

Studio albums

Some of his known works include:
 Mojdeye Bahar
 Afshari Morakkab
 Rast Panjgah Concert
 Ofoghe Mehr
 Vatane Man
 Khazan va Arezou
 Bedahehkhani va Bedahehnavazi
 Bouye Norouz
 Sokout
 Zohour
 Khaneh Bouye Gol Gereft
 Moseme Gol
 Bi Karevane Koli
 Raghse Ashofteh
 Hale Ashofteh
 Fasaneh

References

1957 births
2003 deaths
Iranian classical singers
20th-century Iranian male singers
People from Kerman Province
Persian classical musicians
Deaths in earthquakes